Herb Matthews Jr. (born 10 May 1943) is a former Australian rules footballer who played for Melbourne and South Melbourne in the Victorian Football League (VFL) during the 1960s.

Matthews, the son of Brownlow Medal winner Herbie, started his career at Melbourne, a club he had been with from under-age level. He left Melbourne midway into the 1964 season, a decision which may have cost him a premiership as the Demons went on to win that year's Grand Final. Instead he spent the next six years at South Melbourne, as a defender. He travelled to Ireland in 1967 as part of the Australian Football World Tour, where he represented the VFL.

References

Holmesby, Russell and Main, Jim (2007). The Encyclopedia of AFL Footballers. 7th ed. Melbourne: Bas Publishing.

Matthews, Herb Jr.
Matthews, Herb Jr.
Matthews, Herb Jr.
Matthews, Herb Jr.
Living people